Aag Ka Darya is a 1966 Pakistani black and white film, directed by Humayun Mirza. The dialogues and story writer was Riaz Shahid, with cinematography by Raza Mir. It stars Shamim Ara and Mohammed Ali in leading roles. An unofficial remake of the 1963 Hindi film Mujhe Jeene Do, it revolves around a bandit and a dancing girl. The film features songs and milli naghmay by Noor Jehan, Naseem Begum, Mala Begum, Irene Parveen, Saleem Raza, Ahmad Rushdi and Masood Rana. Aag Ka Darya is one of the few films for which the poetry is done by the renowned Urdu poet, Josh Malihabadi.  Theatrically released on 24 January 1966, the film was a commercially successful film of the year, it was released. The film received praise due to its cinematography but was criticised for copied the plot, and is known for its Nigar Award-winning msuic and national songs. It became a landmark in Ali's career, establishing him as one of the leading actors of the Pakistani cinema.

At annual Nigar Awards, it won in 4 categories, including best actor for Ali, best lyricist for Malihabadi and best cinematographer for Mir.

Plot 

The plot revolves around a bandit and a dancer girl who falls for each other, and yells at the same due to other's deeds. The legal authorities tries to catch the bandit but he manages to escape every time. After the brith of her son, the girl wants a safe and sound future for the son while on the other hand, the bandit also wants to give up his this life for which she helps him.

Cast 

 Muhammad Ali
 Shamim Ara
 Lehri
 Saqi
 Fazal Haq
 M. Ismail
 Nasira
 Salma Mumtaz
 Chham Chham

Music

Release and reception 
Aag Ka Darya was released on 24 January 1966. The film celebrated its Silver jubilee in the Karachi circuit.

In November 2017, it was screened at the Lok Virsa Museum to showcase the historical film records.

Critical reception 
In his book "Pakistan Cinema, 1947–1997", film critic Mushtaq Gazdar praised the cinematography for the depiction of rural and urban Sindh, despite its resemblance with Bollywood flicks Gunga Jumna and Mujhe Jeene Do.

Awards

References 

1960s Urdu-language films
Urdu-language Pakistani films
Pakistani black-and-white films
Pakistani remakes of Indian films